Great Britain first participated at the European Games at the inaugural 2015 Games and earned 47 medals. This tally was more than halved at the 2019 Games, due to the removal of swimming from the competition schedule.

Medal tables

Medals by sport

Medallists
The following British competitors won medals at the 2015 and 2019 editions.

Multiple medallists
The following Team GB competitors won multiple medals at the 2015 European Games.

References